William Wood may refer to one of the following notable people:

Bankers
 William Wood (banker), Scottish-American banker
 William Henry O'Malley Wood, Australian banker, public servant and surveyor

Clergy
 William Wood (botanist) (1745–1808), English Unitarian minister and botanist
 William Robertson Wood (1874–1947), Canadian Presbyterian minister and politician
 William Willis Wood (mayor) (1844–1905), English Wesleyan Methodist preacher, mill owner, and mayor of Bradford, Yorkshire

Entertainers
 Will Wood (musician), American alternative singer-songwriter and lead singer of The Tapeworms
 William Wood (ventriloquist) (c. 1861–1908), American illusionist and ventriloquist
 William "Merlyn" Wood, American vocalist for the band Brockhampton
 William B. Wood (actor) (1779–1861), American theatre manager and actor

Government figures

Civil servants
 Sir William Alan Wood (1916–2010), British civil servant
 W. A. R. Wood (William Alfred Rae Wood) (1878–1970), British diplomat in Siam
 William Braucher Wood (born 1950), American diplomat, former U.S. Ambassador to Afghanistan and Colombia
 William McKenzie Wood, Canadian ambassador to Israel in 1965
 William P. Wood (1820–1903), first Director of the United States Secret Service

Politicians
 William Wood (MP for Berkshire), Member of Parliament (MP) for Berkshire, 1395
 William Wood (15th century MP), MP for Winchester, 1413
 William Wood, 1st Baron Hatherley (1801–1881), British statesman and Lord High Chancellor of Great Britain
 William Wood (MP for Pontefract) (1816–1872), British MP for Pontefract
 William Wood (New Zealand politician) (1827–1884), New Zealand politician for Invercargill and Mataura
 William Wood (Australian politician) (1869–1953), member of the New South Wales Parliament
 William Wood (Texas politician), member of the Twentieth Texas Legislature (1887–1888)
 William R. Wood (Indiana politician) (1861–1933), U.S. Representative from Indiana
 William Thomas Wood (1854–1943), New Zealand politician

Industrialists
 William Bruce Wood (1848–1928), Canadian mill owner and political figure in Ontario
 William Madison Wood (1858–1926), American textile mill owner in Massachusetts
 William Valentine Wood (1883–1959), Irish-born president of the London, Midland and Scottish Railway, 1941–1947

Military figures
 William D. Wood (1822–1867), American Union brevet brigadier general
 William Maxwell Wood (1809–1880), United States Navy officer and surgeon, first Surgeon General of the U.S. Navy
 USS William M. Wood, the name of three ships of the U.S. Navy (two canceled, one built)
 William W. Wood (1818–1882), U.S. Navy engineer and head of the Bureau of Steam Engineering

Sportspeople

Football (soccer)
 Will Wood (footballer) (born 1996), English football defender for several teams including Ebbsfleet United
 William Wood (footballer, born 1900) (1900–?), English football player for Aberdare Athletic and Stoke
 William Wood (footballer, born April 1910) (1910–?), English football defender for Burnley and Yeovil Town
 William Wood (footballer, born June 1910) (1910–1958), English footballer for several teams including Blackburn Rovers and Burnley
 William Wood (footballer, born 1904) (1904–1961), English footballer, goalkeeper for Rochdale

Other sports
 William Wood (cricketer) (1849–1924), Australian cricketer
 William Wood (athlete) (1881–1940), English-born Canadian track and field athlete
 William Wood (wrestler) (1886–1971), British wrestler
 William Wood (rower) (1899–1969), Canadian rower and Olympic silver medalist
 William Wood (diver) (1946–2000), English competition diver
 William H. Wood (American football) (1900–1988), American gridiron football coach and United States Army officer
 William Wood-Sims (1858–1925), English cricketer

Trade unionists
 William Wood (trade unionist) (1873–1956), British trade union leader
  William H. Wood, American labor union leader, first president of the National Association of Letter Carriers, 1889–1890
 William Henry Wood (fl. 1860s), British trade union leader

Other people
 William Wood (ironmaster) (1671–1730), British ironmaster and mint master
 William Wood (Scottish surgeon) (1782–1858), Scottish surgeon
 William Wood (screenwriter), American screenwriter
 William Wood (zoologist) (1774–1857), English entomologist
 William B. Wood (builder) (fl. 1890s), American building contractor in Kentucky
 William Charles Henry Wood (1864–1947), Canadian historian
 William Halsey Wood (1855–1897), American architect
 William J. Wood (1877–1954), Canadian painter and etcher
 William Ransom Wood (1907–2001), president of the University of Alaska, 1960–1973
 William Wightman Wood (fl. 1804–1833), American journalist, businessman and poet

See also
 
 Bill Wood (disambiguation)
 Willie Wood (disambiguation)
 William Woods (disambiguation)